Iain Ross (born 15 December 1928) is a former Scotland international rugby union player. Ross played as a scrum half.

Rugby career

Amateur career

Ross played for Hillhead HSFP.

Provincial career

Ross played for Glasgow District in the 1950 Inter-City match against Edinburgh District. The Herald picked out Ross, J. A. Fergusson and J.C. Dawson as Glasgow's best players in an 11 - 3 victory.

Ross also played in the Scottish Inter-District Championship. He played in the 1954–55 season's match against North and Midlands and in the same season's Inter-City match against Edinburgh District.

International career

Ross was capped for  four times in 1951, playing in all four Five Nations matches of that year.

Outside of rugby

Ross was in the Services before his rugby career.

Ross often went angling with fellow former Hillhead HSFP player Allan Cameron.

References

1928 births
Living people
Rugby union players from Glasgow
Scottish rugby union players
Scotland international rugby union players
Glasgow District (rugby union) players
Hillhead RFC players
Rugby union scrum-halves